On Guard is a 1997 French swashbuckler film directed by Philippe de Broca and starring Daniel Auteuil, Fabrice Luchini, Vincent Perez, and Marie Gillain. Adapted from the 1858 historical novel Le Bossu by Paul Féval, the film is about a skilled swordsman named Lagardère who is befriended by the Duke of Nevers. When the duke is attacked by his evil cousin Gonzague, the duke in his dying moments asks Lagardère to avenge him and look after his infant daughter.

On Guard was released on 3 December 1997 in France. The film had 2,385,688 admissions in France and grossed $96,750 in the United States. On Guard received the César Award for Best Costume Design, and eight César Award Nominations for Best Film, Best Actor, Best Actress, Best Supporting Actor, Best Cinematography, Best Editing, Best Music, and Best Production Design in 1998. The film also received a BAFTA Film Award Nomination for Best Film in 1999.

Plot
In 1700 in Nevers, France, a skilled swordsman named Lagardère (Daniel Auteuil) challenges Duke Philippe de Nevers (Vincent Pérez) to a friendly duel in order to learn his secret lethal maneuver known as the "Nevers Attack". Nevers agrees and quickly dispatches the upstart whom he soon befriends. Nevers learns that he has a "son" by Blanche de Caylus—a fact previously concealed by his cousin and would-be heir, the wicked Comte de Gonzague (Fabrice Luchini). That night Nevers escapes an assassination attempt by Gonzague's men.

Determined to claim his bride, Nevers leaves for Caylus with Lagardère along as his escort. They are followed by Gonzague and his men who plan to murder Nevers before he can marry Blanche and claim his son and heir. Along the way Nevers teaches Lagardère the "Nevers Attack"—an acrobatic sleight of hand that ends with a blade between the opponent's eyes. Soon after, they spot the assassins, and Lagardère is able to delay the attackers long enough to allow Nevers to reach Caylus and marry Blanche. The newlyweds' happiness, however, is short-lived.

When Gonzague and his men arrive at Caylus, they murder the entire wedding party. Lagardère arrives, and after a lengthy sword fight, Nevers is fatally stabbed by a masked Gonzague, who is "branded" by a sword thrust on the hand by Lagardère. Lagardère threatens the unseen killer: "If you do not come to Lagardère," he states, "Lagardère will come to you!"  With his dying breath, Nevers implores Lagardère to avenge him and his wife (who he believes was killed) and to look after their infant child. Lagardère flees Caylus with the infant and finds refuge in the mountains in an abandoned farmhouse, where he discovers that the "son" is in fact a girl, who carries a locket naming her as Aurore.

Gonzague's men track Lagardère to his mountain hideaway looking to kill Nevers' rightful heir. Lagardère and Aurore escape with the help of a band of strolling players who convince the pursuing killers that Lagardère and Aurore have plunged to their deaths in a mountain torrent. After Gonzague's men leave, Lagardère and Aurore join up with the strolling players. Back in Nevers, after attending the funeral of her daughter — the coffin actually contains a wax doll — Blanche retires to a convent, and the evil Gonzague is named executor of her estate.

Sixteen years later, Lagardère and Aurore (Marie Gillain) are still with the players. After witnessing Lagardère defend her against three outlaws using sophisticated swordplay with a stick, Aurore asks about his past. Lagardère keeps his past hidden, but he teaches her the "Nevers Attack". One night after a performance, Aurore is taken to a party given by one of Gonzague's men, Louis-Joseph, and is soon assaulted by the host. Using fencing skills she learned from Lagardère, Aurore escapes her attacker, killing him using the "Nevers Attack". When Gonzague learns how his "finest blade" was killed, he suspects that Aurore is still alive; his suspicions are confirmed when Aurore's tomb is opened revealing a decayed wax doll. Gonzague then orders his men to find and kill her.

Lagardère sets out to plan his revenge on Gonzague. After revealing to Aurore that she is the daughter of the late Duke of Nevers, and that her mother is still alive, he gains employment as Gonzague's secretary disguised as a hunchback, makes contact with Blanche revealing that her daughter is alive, and then engineers a stock market raid on shares in the Mississippi Company supposedly on behalf of Gonzague — in fact he purchases the stock using gold provided by Blanche for her daughter's benefit.

When Aurore is captured by Gonzague's men, Lagardère executes a daring rescue. That night, the Regent Philippe d'Orléans arrives prepared to name Gonzague a royal agent to Louisiana. The ceremony is interrupted, however, by Lagardère who escorts Aurore into the hall, introducing her as the majority holder of the Mississippi Company stock. Blanche confirms Aurore is her daughter.  Lagardère then discards his disguise and accuses Gonzague of murdering Duke Philippe de Nevers. As proof he exposes Gonzague's hand — the one he branded at the scene of the murder. In the swordfight that follows, Lagardère kills Gonzague using the "Nevers Attack". Aurore then instructs Lagardère to kiss her, and the two embrace each other.

Cast

 Daniel Auteuil as Lagardère
 Fabrice Luchini as Gonzague
 Vincent Pérez as Nevers
 Marie Gillain as Aurore de Nevers
 Yann Collette as Peyrolles
 Jean-François Stévenin as Cocardasse
 Didier Pain as Passepoil
 Charlie Nelson as Esope
 Claire Nebout as Blanche de Caylus
 Philippe Noiret as Philippe d'Orléans
 Jacques Sereys as Caylus
 Renato Scarpa as Paolo
 Ludovica Tinghi as Ornella
 James Thiérrée as Marcello
 Urbain Cancelier as Argenson
 Sacha Bourdo as Giuseppe
 Margot Marguerite as Bergues
 François Levantal as The Knight
 Jean Antolinos as Magistrat
 Simon Doniol-Valcroze as Agioteur d'Ursulines
 Xavier Doumen as Spadassin cour de ferme
 Etienne Draber as Un courtier
 Gérard Gros as D'Esparon
 Jean Le Rouzic as Chapelain Caylus
 Thierry Nenez as Domestique Caylus
 Jacques Villa as Chambellan

Production

Filming locations
On Guard was filmed on location in France at the Château-Ville-Vieille, in Hautes-Alpes, the Hôtel de Sully in Paris 4, Le Mans in Sarthe, and the Place des Vosges in Paris 4, and various locations in Queyras in Hautes-Alpes.

Release
On Guard was released on 3 December 1997 in France.

Reception

Critical response
On Guard received generally positive reviews in the United States. In his review in The New York Times, A. O. Scott described the film as "full of durable cinematic pleasures: a little sex, a lot of sword fighting and a plot that combines heady passion with complicated political intrigue." Scott singled out Auteuil's performance delivered with "unabashed gusto and unexpected warmth."

In his review for Salon.com, Charles Taylor called On Guard "one of the best swashbucklers in movie history", writing, "For sheer entertainment it puts nearly everything else that's playing to shame. De Broca's film is a delight from top to bottom, packed with romance, adventure, beautifully executed swordplay and a sumptuous period look." Taylor described Auteuil's performance as "simply wonderful" and that "his range seems to be as wide as that of almost any actor now working in the movies". Taylor continues:

In his review in the Los Angeles Times, Kevin Thomas called the film "an enchanting, richly detailed period piece" and arguably Philippe de Broca's "most substantial film." Thomas goes on to write:

In his review on the What's on TV website, Jason Best writes, "As adroit and artful as his hero, de Broca gets the tone of Le Bossu perfectly right—romantic, thrilling and with a sense of fun that never slips into parody or self-mockery." In his review on the Foster on Film website, Matthew Foster wrote, "On Guard is the kind of fun Swashbuckler that Hollywood has forgotten how to make. A few subtitles are well worth the price for some stirring adventure."

On the review aggregator web site Rotten Tomatoes, the film holds an 87% positive rating from top film critics based on 31 reviews.

Accolades

See also
 Le Bossu (1959)

References

External links
 
 
 

1997 films
1990s historical adventure films
Films directed by Philippe de Broca
Films scored by Philippe Sarde
French historical adventure films
1990s French-language films
French swashbuckler films
Films set in the 1700s
Films set in the 1710s
Films based on French novels
Remakes of French films
1990s French films